These are the Australian Country number-one albums of 2011, per the ARIA Charts.

See also
2011 in music
List of number-one albums of 2011 (Australia)

References

2011
Australia country album
Number-one country albums